Sir Ralph Henry Knox, KCB, VD, PC (21 April 1836 – 21 July 1913) was a British civil servant. He was Permanent Under-Secretary of State for War from 1897 to 1901.

Biography 
Educated at Trinity College, Dublin, Knox entered the War Office as a temporary clerk in January 1856 and was added to the establishment as junior clerk in 1858. After serving as secretary of two royal commissions, Knox was appointed Accountant-General at the War Office in 1882. In 1897, he was promoted Permanent Under-Secretary of State for War in 1897, serving until his retirement 1901. 

In retirement, he served on various commissions, including ones connected with the Cardwell Reforms.

Knox was appointed CB in 1880 and promoted KCB in 1895. He was sworn of the Privy Council in 1903.

References 

 https://www.ukwhoswho.com/view/10.1093/ww/9780199540891.001.0001/ww-9780199540884-e-187898

Alumni of Trinity College Dublin
1913 deaths
Permanent Under-Secretaries of State for War
Civil servants in the War Office
Knights Commander of the Order of the Bath
Members of the Privy Council of the United Kingdom